Ringo: la pelea de su vida , or simply Ringo is a Mexican telenovela produced by Lucero Suárez that premiered on Las Estrellas on 21 January 2019 and ended on 12 May 2019. It is an adaption on the Argentine telenovela created by Adrián Suar entitled Sos mi hombre. The telenovela stars José Ron, and Mariana Torres. The series revolves around Ringo, the life of a retired boxer and the problems he will face in the face of an economic crisis, couple problems and the custody of his son.

Plot 
Ringo is a young man, who has dedicated his life to boxing, and at the peak of his career he loses the national title upon receiving the news of the death of his brother. From that moment, Ringo decides to retire from boxing. Gloria, his wife, leaves him to go live with El Turco, Ringo's main rival in the ring. Gloria's decision leaves Ringo alone in charge of the care of his son Santi. Then, Gloria will return to claim custody of her son, and in that situation, Ringo will have to obtain a job that provides fixed income, to keep custody of his son. He decides to return to boxing with the clear goal to be crowned champion.

Cast 

 José Ron as Juan José Ramírez "Ringo"
 Mariana Torres as Julia Garay
 César Évora as Oscar "Oso" Villar
 Jorge Poza as Diego Jáuregui
 Silvia Mariscal as Teresa
 Otto Sirgo as Iván
 Luz Ramos as Rosa
 Óscar Bonfiglio as Manuel
 Pierre Angelo as Damasio
 Arturo Carmona as Alejo Correa
 Alfredo Gatica as Ariel "El Turco" Nasif
 Gabriela Carrillo as Gloria
 Luz Edith Rojas as Brenda
 Edsa Ramírez as Eva
 José Manuel Rincón as Rafael
 Santiago González as Máximo
 Francisco Pizaña as Carrizo
 José Manuel Lechuga as Pepe
 Paco Luna as Guachin
 Patricio de la Garza as Santiago
 Pierre Louis as Javier "Gavilán Machaca"
 Isadora González as Sandra
 Claudia Boyán as Elsa
 Alberto Estrella as Guevara
 Mercedes Vaughan as Marta
 Adalberto Parra as Antunes
 Marlene Kalb as La Zorra Gutiérrez

Production

Casting 
On 31 January 2018, José Ron confirmed his participation in the telenovela through his Instagram account. On 20 February 2018, Mariana Torres was confirmed as co-stars of the production. On 5 March 2018, the Latin Show News website confirmed that César Évora, Luz Ramos, Pierre Louis, Alfredo Gatica, Jorge Poza, Claudia Boyán, Arturo Carmona, Gabriela Carrillo, Silvia Mariscal, Luz Edith Rojas, Isadora González and Gaby Mellado would be part of the main cast.

Ratings

Mexico ratings 
 
}}
Notes

U.S. ratings 
  
}}

Episodes

Awards and nominations

References

External links 
 

2019 telenovelas
Mexican telenovelas
2019 Mexican television series debuts
2019 Mexican television series endings
Televisa telenovelas
Mexican television series based on Argentine television series
Spanish-language telenovelas
Television shows set in Mexico City
Spanish-language television shows